Kingfisher was an extreme clipper built in 1853 that sailed on the San Francisco route as well as to Hawaii on its way to China. It eventually sailed out of Uruguay. She was one of the longest lived clipper ships, with a sailing life of 36 years and 5 months. A sailing card advertised her.

Construction

She had a small deckhouse aft, and a larger deckhouse forward. The hull was black, with pearl colored bulwarks, and blue waterways on the upper deck. The hull sheathing was yellow metal. Kingfisher had deck structures and hatchway coamings of East India teak.

She had:

Life aboard
In the early 1860s, Joe Taylor, a member of the Backus’ Minstrels troupe en route to Shanghai via Hawaii, described Kingfisher as follows:

Voyages
Kingfisher arrived in Honolulu:

Fate
In 1890 she was "sold at auction and broken up in Montevideo Bay".

References

External links
 Tully Crosby, commander of brig Old Colony, barque Arab, and ships Kingfisher, Monterey, Antelope of Boston and Charlotte.
 Heave Ahoy!, chantey about the Kingfisher
 Zera L. Tanner, served as first officer of the Kingfisher

California clippers
Individual sailing vessels
Guano trade
Baker Island
Ships built in Medford, Massachusetts
Age of Sail merchant ships of the United States
Merchant ships of the United States
Ships of Uruguay
Maritime incidents in June 1871
1853 ships